Route 128 is a provincial highway in the Canadian province of New Brunswick. The highway starts in Lutes Mountain as Homestead Road at Route 126. The road travels in a horseshoe pattern through two small communities before ending in the city of Moncton at an interchange with Route 15 (Wheeler Boulevard). In the community of Berry Mills, New Brunswick, the road is called Berry Mills Road and in Moncton, Route 128 is also designated Killam Drive.

History
The Berry Mills Road follows a former rail line. When two rival lines, who had built within literally feet of each other, merged in the early 20th century, one was torn up and turned into a road bed. Route 128 was commissioned in 1965, taking over a small part of the former Route 30. It was extended north from Berry Mills in 1997 to Lutes Mountain along a former alignment of Route 2, and shortened in 2003 when the portion of Killam Drive east of Wheeler Boulevard was turned over to City of Moncton control.

Major intersections

References

External links

128
128
Transport in Moncton